The chapters of Tramps Like Us were written and illustrated by Yayoi Ogawa. The series first appeared as a single chapter work, named Pet, that appeared in the June 2000 issue of Kiss Carnival, where it ran for four chapters. It was then transferred to Kiss later in 2000 where it ran until 2005. It was renamed to Kimi wa Pet after the fifth chapter. The chapters tell the story of Sumire, a young professional woman who takes in a younger man as a pet, and her attempts to keep her coworkers and boyfriend from finding out about her pet. The chapters were adapted into a television drama in 2003.

The 82 chapters, called "Rules", were collected and published in 14 bound volumes by Kodansha between December 2000 and December 2005.  An additional volume called  was released in October 2002.  In early 2004, "Supplement: Kimiwa Pet" was included as a free extra with Kiss.  A special edition of the eleventh volume was offered which included a toy shaped like Momo.  Tokyopop licensed the series for English-language release in North America and gave the series its English name of Tramps Like Us. It released the first volume in August 2004 and the final volume in February 2008. As of August 2009, the English edition is out of print. The series was published as Tramps Like Us - Kimi Wa Pet by Tokyopop Germany between November 2004 and February 2007.  It was published as Kimi Wa Pet - Au pied, chéri! in French by Kurokawa between September 2005 and November 2007.  It was published in Italian by Star Comics between July 2004 and September 2006 as Sei Il Mio Cucciolo!.


Volume list

The Best

References

Tramps Like Us